The 1975  Mediterranean Games football tournament was the 7th edition of the Mediterranean Games men's football tournament. The football tournament was held in Algiers, Algeria between 24 August and 6 September 1975 as part of the 1975 Mediterranean Games and was contested by 9 teams.

Participating teams
Nine teams took part in the tournament. Algeria participated with B team composed mostly of military players. France with B team composed of amateur players.

Squads

Venues

Tournament
All times local : Time zone (UTC+1)

Group stage

Group A

Group B

Knockout stage

Seventh-place match

Fifth-place match

Semi-finals

Third-place match

Final

Tournament classification

External links
Mediterranean Games 1975 (Alger, Algeria) - rsssf.com
Algérie aux Jeux Méditerranéens 1975 - Statistiques DZfootball

1975
Sports at the 1975 Mediterranean Games
1975 in African football
1975–76 in Algerian football
1975–76 in French football
1975–76 in Yugoslav football
1975–76 in Turkish football
1975–76 in Greek football
1975